During the 1991–92 English football season, Crystal Palace competed in the Football League First Division.

Season summary
The 1991–92 season for Crystal Palace was somewhat anticlimactic football-wise, but controversial in another way. A statement by Ron Noades, which he claimed was reported out of context, stunned Palace's many black players. Noades had apparently claimed that black players didn't play hard enough in winter, but that they made up for it at the end of the season. Although he later stated that he was describing a general attitude amongst managers in earlier decades, and that this was not his own opinion, many of Palace's black players began planning to leave, the most notable departure being that of Ian Wright to Arsenal for £2.5 million (a record for both clubs) in September.

Palace finished 10th in the First Division, having never looked in danger of relegation, but they never challenged the leading pack and would be among the 22 founder members of the new FA Premier League for the 1992–93 season. However, they would be without the services of another key player - Mark Bright - who was sold to Sheffield Wednesday. The Yorkshire club had just finished third in the league and qualified for the UEFA Cup, and were looking more likely to be chasing honours than a Palace side who were now looking like a thin shadow of what they had been a year or two earlier.

Final league table

Results
Crystal Palace's score comes first

Legend

Football League First Division

FA Cup

League Cup

Full Members Cup

Squad

Transfers

In

Out

Transfers in:  £2,875,000
Transfers out:  £4,775,000
Total spending:  £1,900,000

References

Crystal Palace F.C. seasons
Crystal Palace